Other gondi

Asifabad is a census town and the district headquarters of Kumuram Bheem district in the Indian state of Telangana. It is located in Asifabad mandal of Asifabad revenue division. It is situated on the banks of Peddavagu river.

History
Asifabad was ruled by many dynasties like the Kakatiyas, Mauryas, Satavahanas, Chalukyas, Qutub Shahis , Asaf Jahis & Gonds.  In 1905, Asifabad was carved as a district but was later merged into the Adilabad district. In 1913, it was made as headquarters of the district prior to the status being lost to Adilabad in 1941. It was again carved from Adilabad district in 2016.

Geography 
It has an average elevation of 218 metres (715 feet)

Demographics
As per 2001 India census, Asifabad had a population of 19,334. Males constitute 52% of the population and females constitute 48% of the population. Asifabad has an average literacy rate of 62%, with 59% of the males and 41% of females literate.

Languages
Telugu is the most spoken language in town. Due to geographical proximity with Maharashtra, Marathi is also widely spoken and understood. Other languages spoken here the native Gondi and Hindi.

Transport
The State Highway 1, Rajiv Rahadari, Hyderabad-Karimnagar-Ramagundam-Bellampalli-Chandrapur highway passes through Asifabad. Asifabad is connected to Hyderabad, Warangal, Pamuru, Nizamabad, Vemulawada, Godavarikhani, Karimnagar cities and surrounding villages in Telangana by the Telangana State Road Transport Corporation bus depot.

The town is served by Asifabad Road [ASAF] railway station which is located 19 km away at Rebbena. However Sirpur Kaghaznagar [SKZR] railway station provides good connectivity with Asifabad town and its A+ category station located 28 km from Asifabad. The railway station lies on New Delhi–Chennai main line. It is administered by South Central Railway zone, Secunderabad division.

Air
The nearest airport is Nagpur Airport (231 km away) and Hyderabad Airport (309 km away).

Culture
 Hanuman temple
 Kanyaka Parameshwari temple
 Keshavnath temple
 Baleshwara temple

Education
This is the list of educational institutions in the city.
 Govt Jr College
 Government Boys High School
 Government Girls High School
 Sree Saraswati Sishu Mandir
 Sree Vasavi Vidhya Mandir High School
 St Marys High School
 Holy Trinity School
St Joels EM High School 
 Sri Chaitanya Inter And Degree College
 Matrusri Degree College

Notable people 

 Komaram Bheem, freedom fighter
 Konda Laxman Bapuji, freedom fighter

See also
 Komaram Bheem district
 List of cities in Telangana by population

References 

Cities and towns in Komaram Bheem district
Komaram Bheem district
Mandals in Komaram Bheem district